Bethelridge is an unincorporated community in southeastern Casey County, Kentucky, United States. Their post office was in operation from May 14, 1890, until it closed in November 2011.

References

Unincorporated communities in Casey County, Kentucky
Unincorporated communities in Kentucky